Edmund Wilcox Hubard (February 20, 1806 – December 9, 1878) was a nineteenth-century politician, appraiser and justice of the peace from Virginia, USA.

Biography
Born near Farmville, Virginia, Hubard attended private schools as a child and went on to attend the University of Virginia. He engaged in agricultural pursuits and was a justice of the peace before being elected as a Democrat to the United States House of Representatives in 1840, serving from 1841 to 1847. Hubard was not a candidate for re-election in 1846 and instead resumed engagements in agricultural pursuits. During the Civil War, he was a colonel of a militia regiment in 1864 and was an appraiser of the Confederate States Government to regulate the value of the Confederate dollar. Hubard died at his home near Farmville, Virginia, on December 9, 1878, and was interred in the family cemetery near the home.

Electoral history

1841
Hubard was elected to the U.S. House of Representatives with 50.42% of the vote, defeating Whig John T. Hill.

1843
Hubard was re-elected with 51.51% of the vote, defeating Whig Richard H. Toler.

1845
Hubard won re-election with 49.93% of the vote, defeating Whig John J. Hill.

External links
 Hubard Family Papers 1741-1907 University of North Carolina. 
 Retrieved on 2008-10-10

1806 births
1878 deaths
University of Virginia alumni
Confederate States Army officers
People of Virginia in the American Civil War
Democratic Party members of the United States House of Representatives from Virginia
19th-century American politicians
People from Farmville, Virginia